DNA-directed RNA polymerases I, II, and III subunit RPABC4 is a protein that in humans is encoded by the POLR2K gene.

This gene encodes one of the smallest subunits of RNA polymerase II, the polymerase responsible for synthesizing messenger RNA in eukaryotes. This subunit is shared by the other two DNA-directed RNA polymerases.

Interactions 

POLR2K has been shown to interact with POLR2C.

References

Further reading